Events from the year 1459 in England.

Incumbents
 Monarch – Henry VI
 Lord Chancellor – William Waynflete
 Lord Privy Seal – Lawrence Booth

Events
 23 September – Wars of the Roses: at the Battle of Blore Heath in Staffordshire, Yorkists under Richard Neville, 5th Earl of Salisbury defeat a Lancastrian force.
 12 October – Wars of the Roses: Lancastrian victory at the Battle of Ludford Bridge. Following the battle, the Duke of York flees to Ireland.
 10 November – Parliament of Devils, held at Coventry, condemns Yorkists as traitors.

Births
 Edward Poynings, Lord Deputy of Ireland to Henry VII (died 1521)

Deaths
 James Tuchet, 5th Baron Audley (born c. 1398) (killed in battle)
 John Fastolf, soldier (born 1380)
 Thomas Stanley, 1st Baron Stanley, nobleman (born 1405)
 Walter Devereux, prominent Yorkist (born 1411)

 
Years of the 15th century in England